|}

The Bristol Novices' Hurdle is a Grade 2 National Hunt hurdle race in Great Britain which is open to horses aged four years or older. It is run on the New Course at Cheltenham over a distance of about 3 miles (2 miles 7 furlongs and 213 yards, or 4,822 metres), and during its running there are twelve hurdles to be jumped. The race is for novice hurdlers, and it is scheduled to take place each year in December.

The event was extended from 2 miles and 4½ furlongs to its present distance in 1994, and at the same time it was given Grade 2 status. It has been sponsored by the vegetable growing company Albert Bartlett since 2007.

Winners since 1988

See also
 Horse racing in Great Britain
 List of British National Hunt races

References
 Racing Post:

 pedigreequery.com – Bristol Novices' Hurdle – Cheltenham.
 telegraph.co.uk – "Cheltenham racing abandoned after rain" (2008).

National Hunt races in Great Britain
Cheltenham Racecourse
National Hunt hurdle races